Monarchism is the advocacy of the system of monarchy or monarchical rule. A monarchist is an individual who supports this form of government independent of any specific monarch, whereas one who supports a particular monarch is a royalist. Conversely, the opposition to monarchical rule is referred to as republicanism.

Depending on the country, a royalist may advocate for the rule of the person who sits on the throne, a regent, a pretender, or someone who would otherwise occupy the throne but has been deposed.

Albania 

 Pandeli Evangjeli (1859–1949)
 Salih Vuçitërni (1880–1949)
 Ismet Bey Kryeziu (1889–1952)
 Abaz Kupi (1892–1976)
 Prenk Pervizi (1897–1977)
 Tahir Dizdari (1900–1972)
 Crown Prince Leka Zogu I (1939–2011)
 Ekrem Spahiu (born 1960)
 Crown Prince Leka Zogu II (born 1982)

American 

 Lewis Nicola (1717–1807)
 Nathaniel Gorham (1738–1796)
 Alexander Hamilton (1755 or 1757–1804)
 James Strang (1813–1856)
 Joshua Norton (1818–1880)
 Ralph Adams Cram (1863–1942)
 Solange Hertz (1920–2015)
 Leland B. Yeager (1924–2018)
 Lee Walter Congdon (born 1939)
 Charles A. Coulombe (born 1960)
 Michael Auslin (born 1967)

Hawaiian 

 Samuel Nowlein (1851–1905)
 Lydia Liliuokalani Kawānanakoa (1905–1969)
 Abigail Kinoiki Kekaulike Kawānanakoa (1926–2022)
 Owana Salazar (born 1953)

Argentine 

 Manuel Belgrano (1770–1820)

Australian 

 Arthur Groom (1904–1953)
 Joan Sutherland (1926–2010)
 Tony Abbott (born 1957)
 Sophie Mirabella (born 1968)
Scott Morrison (born 1968)

Austrian 

 Georg von Trapp (1880–1947)
 Engelbert Dollfuss (1892-1934)
 Joseph Roth (1894–1939)
 Kurt Schuschnigg (1897-1977)
 Erik von Kuehnelt-Leddihn (1909–1999)
 Ernst Fuchs (1930–2015)

Belgian 

 Hergé (1903–1983)
 Leon Degrelle (1906–1994)

Brazilian 

 José Bonifácio (1763–1838)
 Maria Quitéria (1792–1853)
 Baron of Taunay (1795–1881)
 Duke of Caxias (1803–1880)
 Count of Porto Alegre (1804–1875)
 Viscount of Itajubá (1805–1884)
 Baron of Santo Ângelo (1806–1879)
 Viscount of Rio Branco (1819–1880)
 João Lustosa da Cunha Paranaguá, Marquis of Paranaguá (1821–1912)
 José de Alencar (1829–1877)
 Antônio Conselheiro (1830–1897)
 Gaspar da Silveira Martins (1835–1901)
 Carlos Gomes (1836–1896)
 Afonso Celso, Viscount of Ouro Preto (1836–1912)
 André Rebouças (1838–1898)
 Machado de Assis (1839–1908)
 Joaquim Nabuco (1839–1910)
 Viscount of Taunay (1843–1899)
 Baron of Rio Branco (1845–1912)
 José do Patrocínio (1853–1905)
 Alberto Santos-Dumont (1873–1932)
 Monteiro Lobato (1882–1948)
 Câmara Cascudo (1898–1986)
 Arlindo Veiga dos Santos (1902–1978)
 Plinio Corrêa de Oliveira (1908–1995)
 José Osvaldo de Meira Penna (1917–2017)
 Ariano Suassuna (1927–2014)
 Prince Bertrand of Orléans-Braganza (born 1941)
 Olavo de Carvalho (1947–2022)
 Gilberto Callado (born 1956)
 Delegado Waldir (born 1962)
 Márcio Bittar (born 1963)
 Luiz Philippe of Orléans-Braganza (born 1969)
 Carla Zambelli (born 1980)
 Paulo Eduardo Martins (born 1981)
 Enrico Misasi (born 1994)

British 

 Winston Churchill (1874–1965)
 T.S. Eliot (1888–1965)
 Agatha Christie (1890–1976)
 J.R.R. Tolkien (1892–1973)
 Hector Bolitho (1897–1974)
 C.S. Lewis (1898–1963)
 John Betjeman (1906–1984)
 Harold Wilson  (1916–1995)
 Anthony Burgess (1917–1993)
 Peregrine Worsthorne (1923–2020)
 Mary Warnock, Baroness Warnock (1924–2019)
 Joan Collins (born 1933)
 Alan Bennett (born 1933)
 Judi Dench (born 1934)
 Nikolai Tolstoy (1935)
 John Major (born 1943)
 Simon Blackburn (born 1944) 
 Tony Blair (born 1953)
 Ian Botham (born 1955)
 Stephen Fry (born 1957)
 Rupert Everett (born 1959)
 Peter Whittle (born 1961)
 Tracey Emin (born 1963)
 Peter Morgan (born 1963)
 Rachel Johnson (born 1965)
 David Cameron (born 1966)

Canadian 

 George-Étienne Cartier (1814–1873)
 John A. Macdonald  (1815–1891)
 Alexander Tilloch Galt(1817–1893)
 Thomas D'Arcy McGee (1825–1868)
 Henri-Gustave Joly de Lotbinière (1829–1908)
 Emily Carr (1871–1945)
 William Lyon Mackenzie King (1874–1950)
 David Milne (1882–1953)
 Louis St. Laurent (1882–1973)
 Vincent Massey (1887–1967)
 Georges Vanier (1888–1967)
 Conn Smythe (1895–1980)
 John Diefenbaker (1895–1979)
 Lester B. Pearson (1897–1972)
 Eugene Forsey (1904–1991)
 George Montegu Black II (1911–1976)
 Robertson Davies (1913–1995)
 George Grant (1918–1988)
 Pierre Trudeau (1919–2000)
 Nancy Bell (1924–1989)
 Robert Layton (1925–2002)
 Glenn Gould (1932–1982)
 Jean Chrétien (born 1934)
 Don Cherry (born 1934)
 Margaret Atwood (born 1939)
 Charles Pachter (born 1942)
 Michael Valpy (born 1942)
 John Fraser (born 1944)
 Jack Layton (1950–2011)
 Kevin S. MacLeod (born 1951)
 Andrew Coyne (born 1960)
 Ray Novak (born 1977)

Chinese 

 Zhang Xun (1854–1923)
 Xu Shichang (1855–1939)
 Kang Youwei (1858–1927)
 Yuan Shikai (1859–1916)
 Zhang Zuolin (1875–1928)

Costa Rican 

 Tranquilino de Bonilla y Herdocia (1797–1864)
 José Rafael Gallegos (1784–1850)
 Manuel María de Peralta y López del Corral (?–1837)

Croatian 

 Josip Frank (1844–1911)

Czech 

 Adolf Born (1930–2016)
 Miroslav Štěpánek (1923–2005)

Fijian 

 George Cakobau (1912–1989)
 Penaia Ganilau (1918–1993)
 Kamisese Mara (1920–2004)

French 

 Jacques-Bénigne Bossuet (1627–1704)
 Thomas de Mahy, Marquis de Favras (1744–1790)
 Joseph de Maistre (1753–1821)
 Armand-Emmanuel de Vignerot du Plessis, duc de Richelieu (1766–1822)
 Jacques Laffitte (1767–1844)
 François-René de Chateaubriand (1768–1848)
 Joseph de Villèle (1773–1854)
 Casimir Pierre Périer (1777–1832)
 Jules de Polignac (1780–1847)
 Élie, duc Decazes (1780–1860)
 Casimir-Louis-Victurnien de Rochechouart de Mortemart (1787–1875)
 Pierre-Antoine Berryer (1790–1868)
 Honoré de Balzac (1799–1850)
 Jacques Crétineau-Joly (1803–1875)
 Auguste-Alexandre Ducrot (1817–1882)
 Louis Gaston Adrien de Ségur (1820–1881)
 Louis Billot (1846–1931)
 Henri de Gaulle (1848–1932)
 Henri Vaugeois (1864–1916)
 Charles Maurras (1868–1952)
 Jacques Bainville (1879–1936)
 Pierre Benoit (1886–1962)
 Henri d'Astier de la Vigerie (1897–1952)
 Thierry Maulnier (1909–1988)
 Georges-Paul Wagner (1921–2006)
 Jean Raspail (1925–2020)
 Pierre Pujo (1929–2007)

German 

 Fedor von Bock (1880–1945)
 August von Mackensen (1849–1945)
 Carl Friedrich Goerdeler (1884–1945)
 Franz Josef Strauss (1915–1988)
 Otto von Bismarck (1815–1898)

Greek 

 Ioannis Metaxas (1871–1941)
 Dimitrios Gounaris (1867–1922)
 Panagis Tsaldaris (1868–1936)
 Alexandros Papagos (1883–1955)
 Konstantinos Tsaldaris (1884–1970)
 Georgios Grivas (1897–1974)
 Georgios Rallis (1918–2006)
 Ilias Kasidiaris (1980–)

Hungarian 

Albert Apponyi (1846–1933)
József Mindszenty (1892–1975)
Margit Slachta (1884–1974)

Italian 

 Thomas Aquinas (1225-1274)
 Dante Alighieri (c. 1265–1321)
 Robert Bellarmine (1542-1621)
 Pope Pius VI (1717-1799)
 Fabrizio Ruffo (1744-1827)
 Francesco Crispi (1818–1901)
 Pope Pius XII (1876–1958)

Japanese 

 Kitabatake Chikafusa (1293–1354)
Yamazaki Ansai (1619–1682)
Kamo no Mabuchi (1697–1769)
Motoori Norinaga (1730–1801)
Hirata Atsutane (1776–1843)
Aizawa Seishisai (1782–1863)
Yoshida Shōin (1830–1859)
Hiraizumi Kiyoshi (1895–1984)
 Yukio Mishima (1925–1970)
 Otoya Yamaguchi (1943–1960)
Yoshiko Sakurai (born 1945)

Jamaican 

 Alexander Bustamante (1884–1977)
 Sir Howard Cooke (1915–2014)
 Norman Manley (1893–1969)

Maltese 

 George Borg Olivier (1911–1980)

Mauritius 

 Gaëtan Duval (1930–1996)
 Sir Seewoosagur Ramgoolam (1900–1985)

Mexican 

 Lucas Alamán (1792–1853)
 José Mariano Salas (1797–1867)
 Juan Almonte (1803–1869)
 Pelagio Antonio de Labastida y Dávalos (1816–1891)
 Tomás Mejía Camacho (1820–1867)
 Miguel Miramón (1832–1867)
 Leonardo Márquez (1820–1913)

Polish 

 Aleksy Ćwiakowski (1885–1953)
 Stanisław Mackiewicz (1896–1966)
 Michał Marusik (1951–2020)
 Janusz Korwin-Mikke (born 1942)
 Robert Iwaszkiewicz (born 1962)
 Radek Sikorski (born 1963)
 Grzegorz Braun (born 1967)

Portuguese 

 Ramalho Ortigão (1836–1915)
 Guilherme de Santa-Rita (1889–1918)
 António Sardinha (1887–1925)
 Sophia de Mello Breyner Andresen (1919–2004)
 Gonçalo Ribeiro Telles (1922–2020)
 Miguel Esteves Cardoso (born 1955)

Russian 

 Nikolai Gogol (1809-1852)
 Fyodor Dostoevsky (1821-1881)
 Nikolai Golitsyn (1850-1925)
 Alexander Dubrovin (1855-unknown)
 Fyodor Viktorovich Vinberg (1868–1927)
 Vladimir Purishkevich (1870–1920)
 Vladimir Zhirinovsky (1946–2022)
 Valentina Matviyenko (born 1949)
 Boris Nemtsov (1959–2015)
 Anton Bakov (born 1965)
 Natalia Poklonskaya (born 1980)
 Anna Kuznetsova (born 1982)

Serbian 

Milan Nedić (1878–1946)
Nikolaj Velimirović (1881–1956)
Dimitrije Ljotić (1891–1945)
Draža Mihajlović (1893–1946)
Momčilo Đujić  (1907–1999)
Pavle, Serbian Patriarch (1914–2009)
Irinej, Serbian Patriarch (1930–2020)
Nebojša M. Krstić (1964–2001)

South African 

 De Villiers Graaff (1913–1999)
 Cecil Rhodes (1853–1902)
 Jan Smuts (1870–1950)

Spanish 

 Jaime Balmes (1810–1848)
 Antonio Cánovas del Castillo (1828–1897)
 Pedro Muñoz Seca (1879–1936)
 Salvador Dalí (1904–1989)
 Pablo Casado (born 1981)

References 

Monarchism
Monarchists